"Looking Back to See" is a song written and originally performed by Jim Ed Brown and Maxine Brown of The Browns. In June 1954, the Browns' version of the song reached No. 8 on the Billboard country and western chart.  

The song was covered by Goldie Hill and Justin Tubbs in a record released on the Decca label (catalog no. 29145). In July 1954, the Hill/Tubbs version peaked at No. 4. The Hill/Tubbs version was also ranked as the No. 8 record on Billboards 1954 year-end country and western juke box chart.

See also
 Billboard Top Country & Western Records of 1954

References

American country music songs
The Browns songs
1954 songs